Gary L. Smith Jr. (born August 27, 1972), is an American attorney from his native Norco in St. Charles Parish, Louisiana, who is a Democratic member of the Louisiana State Senate for District 19, a position which he has held since 2012.

He succeeded the term-limited Democratic Senator Joel T. Chaisson, II.

Personal life and education
Smith graduated in 1990 from Destrehan High School in Destrehan in St. Charles Parish. In 1994, he earned a Bachelor of Business Administration degree from Louisiana State University in Baton Rouge. He earned his Juris Doctor from Loyola University New Orleans College of Law in 1998 and an LLM from Tulane Law School in 1999. He is married to Katherine Mosley, the granddaughter of U.S. Senator Russell Long and the great-granddaughter of Louisiana Governor Huey Long.

Career
Smith interned for Senator John Breaux and Congressman Billy Tauzin. Smith was elected to the Louisiana House of Representatives in 2000, and to the Louisiana State Senate in 2012.

References

External links
Vote Smart page

1972 births
21st-century American politicians
Destrehan High School alumni
Living people
Louisiana State University alumni
Loyola University New Orleans College of Law alumni
Democratic Party members of the Louisiana House of Representatives
Democratic Party Louisiana state senators
People from Norco, Louisiana
Tulane University Law School alumni